Generosa is a settlement in the Lembá District in the western part of São Tomé Island in São Tomé and Príncipe. Its population is 448 (2012 census). It lies 1 km southwest of Ponta Figo and 3 km southwest of Neves.

Population history

References

Populated places in Lembá District